Billy Parker may refer to:

 Billy Parker (gridiron football) (born 1981), Arena Football League & Canadian Football League defensive specialist
 Billy Parker (baseball) (1942–2003), professional baseball infielder
 Billy Parker (singer) (born 1939), American DJ and country music singer
 Billy Parker (racing driver) (born 1977), NASCAR Busch Series driver

See also
Bill Parker (disambiguation)
William Parker (disambiguation)